The 2005 Cleveland Indians season was the 105th season for the franchise.  It involved the Indians attempting to win the American League Central division.  They had a very good September (with 17 wins and 9 losses), and went into a season-closing series with the Chicago White Sox with a chance to tie the White Sox record (though the White Sox held the tiebreaker and had already won the division) and make it into the playoffs, but lost three close games to finish 6 games behind the White Sox, who were the eventual World Series winners, eliminating Cleveland from the possibility to go to the playoffs.

Offseason
 November 3, 2004: Ernie Young was signed as a free agent with the Cleveland Indians.
 November 24, 2004: Bob Wickman was signed as a free agent by the Indians.
 January 17, 2005: Juan González was signed as a free agent by the Indians.   His season – and his career – ended on his first regular season at-bat, when he pulled a leg muscle trying to run out a ground ball.

Regular season

Season standings

Record vs. opponents

Notable transactions
 June 7, 2005: Tim Lincecum was drafted by the Cleveland Indians in the 42nd round of the 2005 Major League Baseball draft, but did not sign.

Roster

Game log

|- bgcolor="#bbffbb"
| 65 || June 17 || Diamondbacks || 13–6 || Lee (8–3) || Halsey (4–5) || || Jacobs Field || 23,138 || 35–30 || W7
|- bgcolor="#bbffbb"
| 66 || June 18 || Diamondbacks || 3–1 || Elarton (4–2) || Webb (7–3) || Wickman (19) || Jacobs Field || 28,306 || 35–30 || W8
|- bgcolor="#bbffbb"
| 67 || June 19 || Diamondbacks || 3–2 || Westbrook (4–9) || Estes (5–5) || Wickman (20) || Jacobs Field || 27,416 || 37–30 || W9
|-

|- style="text-align:center;"
| Legend:       = Win       = Loss       = PostponementBold = Indians team member

|-align="center" bgcolor="#ffbbbb"
| 1 || April 4 || @ White Sox || 1 – 0 || Buehrle (1-0) || Westbrook (0-1) || Takatsu (1) || 38,141 || 0-1
|-align="center" bgcolor="#ffbbbb"
| 2 || April 6 || @ White Sox || 4 – 3 || Marte (1-0) || Wickman (0-1) || || 10,520 || 0-2
|-align="center" bgcolor="#bbffbb"
| 3 || April 7 || @ White Sox || 11 – 5 (11) || Rhodes (1-0) || Vizcaíno (0-1) || || 10,800 || 1-2
|-align="center" bgcolor="#bbffbb"
| 4 || April 8 || @ Tigers || 4 – 3 || Riske (1-0) || Urbina (0-1) || Wickman (1) || 23,294 || 2-2
|-align="center" bgcolor="#ffbbbb"
| 5 || April 9 || @ Tigers || 11 – 1 || Ledezma (1-0) || Westbrook (0-2) || || 26,037 || 2-3
|-align="center" bgcolor="#bbffbb"
| 6 || April 10 || @ Tigers || 7 – 6 || Davis (1-0) || Bonderman (0-1) || Wickman (2) || 25,758 || 3-3
|-align="center" bgcolor="#ffbbbb"
| 7 || April 11 || White Sox || 2 – 1 || García (1-0) || Millwood (0-1) || Takatsu (3) || 42,461 || 3-4
|-align="center" bgcolor="#ffbbbb"
| 8 || April 13 || White Sox || 5 – 4 (10) || Vizcaíno (1-1) || Howry (0-1) || Hermanson (1) || 14,410 || 3-5
|-align="center" bgcolor="#bbffbb"
| 9 || April 14 || White Sox || 8 – 6 || Betancourt (1-0) || Hernández (1-1) || Wickman (3) || 12,470 || 4-5
|-align="center" bgcolor="#ffbbbb"
| 10 || April 15 || Twins || 3 – 2 || Santana (3-0) || Westbrook (0-3) || Nathan (3) || 15,360 || 4-6
|-align="center" bgcolor="#ffbbbb"
| 11 || April 16 || Twins || 6 – 4 || Gassner (1-0) || Millwood (0-2) || Nathan (4) || 18,699 || 4-7
|-align="center" bgcolor="#bbffbb"
| 12 || April 17 || Twins || 2 – 1 || Howry (1-1) || Romero (0-1) || Wickman (4) || 19,021 || 5-7
|-align="center" bgcolor="#bbffbb"
| 13 || April 18 || @ Royals || 5 – 1 || Lee (1-0) || Greinke (0-1) || || 11,115 || 6-7
|-align="center" bgcolor="#ffbbbb"
| 14 || April 19 || @ Royals || 6 – 5 || MacDougal (1-0) || Rhodes (1-1) || || 11,884 || 6-8
|-align="center" bgcolor="#ffbbbb"
| 15 || April 20 || @ Angels || 2- 0 || Colón (3-1) || Westbrook (0-4) || Rodríguez (3) || 42,531 || 6-9
|-align="center" bgcolor="#ffbbbb"
| 16 || April 21 || @ Angels || 6 – 5 (10) || Rodríguez (1-0) || Davis (1-1) || || 39,673 || 6-10
|-align="center" bgcolor="#bbffbb"
| 17 || April 22 || @ Mariners || 6 – 1 || Sabathia (1-0) || Meche (1-1) || || 43,207 || 7-10
|-align="center" bgcolor="#bbffbb"
| 18 || April 23 || @ Mariners || 5 – 2 || Lee (2-0) || Sele (1-2) || Wickman (5) || 33,564 || 8-10
|-align="center" bgcolor="#ffbbbb"
| 19 || April 24 || @ Mariners || 9 – 1 || Moyer (4-0) || Elarton (0-1) || || 32,889 || 8-11
|-align="center" bgcolor="#bbbbbb"
| -- || April 26 || Tigers || colspan=6|Postponed (rain) Rescheduled for July 4
|-align="center" bgcolor="#ffbbbb"
| 20 || April 27 || Tigers || 10 – 3 || Bonderman (3-2) || Westbrook (0-5) || || 12,162 || 8-12
|-align="center" bgcolor="#ffbbbb"
| 21 || April 28 || Tigers || 3 – 2 || Maroth (2-1) || Millwood (0-3) || Percival (2) || 13,809 || 8-13
|-align="center" bgcolor="#bbffbb"
| 22 || April 29 || Royals || 6 – 0 || Sabathia (2-0) || Greinke (0-2) || || 16,666 || 9-13
|-align="center" bgcolor="#ffbbbb"
| 23 || April 30 || Royals || 8 – 1 || Bautista (2-1) || Lee (2-1) || || 15,771 || 9-14
|-

|-align="center" bgcolor="#ffbbbb"
| 24 || May 1 || Royals || 6 – 5 || Wood (1-2) || Betancourt (1-1) || Burgos (1) || 17,672 || 9-15
|-align="center" bgcolor="#bbffbb"
| 25 || May 3 || @ Twins || 4 – 2 || Westbrook (1-5) || Mays (1-1) || Wickman (6) || 16,919 || 10-15
|-align="center" bgcolor="#bbffbb"
| 26 || May 4 || @ Twins || 5 – 4 || Howry (2-1) || Romero (0-2) || Wickman (7) || 19,856 || 11-15
|-align="center" bgcolor="#ffbbbb"
| 27 || May 5 || @ Twins || 9 – 0 || Radke (3-3) || Sabathia (2-1) || || 18,265 || 11-16
|-align="center" bgcolor="#bbffbb"
| 28 || May 6 || @ Rangers || 8 – 6 || Lee (3-1) || Astacio (1-4) || Wickman (8) || 30,742 || 12-16
|-align="center" bgcolor="#ffbbbb"
| 29 || May 7 || @ Rangers || 6 – 1 || Drese (3-3) || Elarton (0-2) || || 36,311 || 12-17
|-align="center" bgcolor="#ffbbbb"
| 30 || May 8 || @ Rangers || 7 – 2 || Rogers (3-2) || Westbrook (1-6) || Cordero (10) || 23,203 || 12-18
|-align="center" bgcolor="#bbffbb"
| 31 || May 9 || @ Angels || 3 – 0 || Millwood (1-3) || Lackey (3-2) || Wickman (9) || 36,763 || 13-18
|-align="center" bgcolor="#ffbbbb"
| 32 || May 10 || @ Angels || 5 – 4 || Byrd (3-3) || Sabathia (2-2) || Rodríguez (9) || 38,320 || 13-19
|-align="center" bgcolor="#bbffbb"
| 33 || May 11 || @ Angels || 9 – 3 || Lee (4-1) || Escobar (1-2) || || 35,508 || 14-19
|-align="center" bgcolor="#bbffbb"
| 34 || May 13 || Blue Jays || 6 – 4 || Davis (2-1) || Lilly (1-4) || Wickman (10) || 19,637 || 15-19
|-align="center" bgcolor="#bbffbb"
| 35 || May 14 || Blue Jays || 3 – 2 || Rhodes (2-1) || Frasor (1-3) || Wickman (11) || 22,525 || 16-19
|-align="center" bgcolor="#ffbbbb"
| 36 || May 15 || Blue Jays || 5 – 2 || Halladay (6-2) || Sabathia (2-3) || || 23,446 || 16-20
|-align="center" bgcolor="#ffbbbb"
| 37 || May 16 || Angels || 3 – 1 || Byrd (4-3) || Lee (4-2) || Shields (3) || 13,729 || 16-21
|-align="center" bgcolor="#bbffbb"
| 38 || May 17 || Angels || 13 – 5 || Elarton (1-2) || Santana (0-1) || || 15,033 || 17-21
|-align="center" bgcolor="#ffbbbb"
| 39 || May 18 || Angels || 2 – 1 || Colón (5-3) || Westbrook (1-7) || Shields (4) || 19,030 || 17-22
|-align="center" bgcolor="#ffbbbb"
| 40 || May 20 || @ Reds || 2 – 1 || Harang (3-2) || Millwood (1-4) || Graves (10) || 25,412 || 17-23
|-align="center" bgcolor="#bbffbb"
| 41 || May 21 || @ Reds || 5 -3 || Sabathia (3-3) || Ramírez (0-2) || Wickman (12) || 31,083 || 18-23
|-align="center" bgcolor="#bbffbb"
| 42 || May 22 || @ Reds || 9 – 2 || Lee (5-2) || Ortiz (1-3) || || 21,862 || 19-23
|-align="center" bgcolor="#bbffbb"
| 43 || May 23 || Twins || 2 – 1 || Rhodes (3-1) || Lohse (3-3) || Wickman (13) || 13,257 || 20-23
|-align="center" bgcolor="#ffbbbb"
| 44 || May 24 || Twins || 6 – 3 (11) || Crain (4-0) || Riske (1-1) || Nathan (13) || 15,884 || 20-24
|-align="center" bgcolor="#bbffbb"
| 45 || May 25 || Twins || 3 – 2 (10) || Howry (3-1) || Rincón (2-2) || || 15,794 || 21-24
|-align="center" bgcolor="#ffbbbb"
| 46 || May 26 || Twins || 5 – 4 (11) || Crain (5-0) || Riske (1-2) || Nathan (14) || 19,161 || 21-25
|-align="center" bgcolor="#bbffbb"
| 47 || May 27 || Athletics || 4 – 1 || Lee (6-2) || Zito (1-6) || Riske (1) || 19,711 || 22-25
|-align="center" bgcolor="#bbffbb"
| 48 || May 28 || Athletics || 6 – 3 || Elarton (2-2) || Saarloos (1-4) || Howry (1) || 33,646 || 23-25
|-align="center" bgcolor="#bbffbb"
| 49 || May 29 || Athletics || 6 – 2 || Westbrook (2-7) || Etherton (1-1) || Miller (1) || 25,737 || 24-25
|-align="center" bgcolor="#bbffbb"
| 50 || May 31 || @ Twins || 4 – 3 || Sabathia (4-3) || Silva (3-3) || Wickman (14) || 15,494 || 25-25
|-

|-align="center" bgcolor="#ffbbbb"
| 51 || June 1 || @ Twins || 6 – 2 || Radke (5-4) || Lee (6-3) || || 20,739 || 25-26
|-align="center" bgcolor="#ffbbbb"
| 52 || June 2 || @ Twins || 4 – 3 (13) || Romero (1-2) || Betancourt (1-2) || || 17,351 || 25-27
|-align="center" bgcolor="#ffbbbb"
| 53 || June 3 || @ White Sox || 6 – 4 || Hernández (6-1) || Westbrook (2-8) || Hermanson (12) || 23,132 || 25-28
|-align="center" bgcolor="#ffbbbb"
| 54 || June 4 || @ White Sox || 6 – 5 || Garland (9-2) || Davis (2-2) || Hermanson (13) || 26,365 || 25-29
|-align="center" bgcolor="#bbffbb"
| 55 || June 5 || @ White Sox || 6 – 4 (12) || Riske (2-2) || Hermanson (0-1) || || 26,146 || 26-29
|-align="center" bgcolor="#bbffbb"
| 56 || June 7 || @ Padres || 2 – 0 (11) || Betancourt (2-2) || Hoffman (0-2) || Wickman (15) || 25,047 || 27-29
|-align="center" bgcolor="#bbffbb"
| 57 || June 8 || @ Padres || 6 – 1 || Elarton (3-2) || Peavy (5-1) || Howry (2) || 29,464 || 28-29
|-align="center" bgcolor="#ffbbbb"
| 58 || June 9 || @ Padres || 3 – 2 || Eaton (9-1) || Westbrook (2-9) || Hoffman (17) || 27,149 || 28-30
|-align="center" bgcolor="#bbffbb"
| 59 || June 10 || @ Giants || 10 – 2 || Sabathia (5-3) || Tomko (5-8) || || 37,102 || 29-30
|-align="center" bgcolor="#bbffbb"
| 60 || June 11 || @ Giants || 7 – 6 || Davis (3-2) || Schmidt (3-3) || Wickman (16) || 39,961 || 30-30
|-align="center" bgcolor="#bbffbb"
| 61 || June 12 || @ Giants || 5 – 3 || Lee (7-3) || Rueter (2-5) || Wickman (17) || 41,500 || 31-30
|-align="center" bgcolor="#bbffbb"
| 62 || June 14 || Rockies || 11 – 2 || Westbrook (3-9) || Francis (5-4) || || 17,631 || 32-30
|-align="center" bgcolor="#bbffbb"
| 63 || June 15 || Rockies || 7 – 6 (11) || Howry (4-1) || Neal (1-2) || || 20,986 || 33-30
|-align="center" bgcolor="#bbffbb"
| 64 || June 16 || Rockies || 2 – 1 || Millwood (2-4) || Wright (4-6) || Wickman (18) || 19,244 || 34-30
|-align="center" bgcolor="#bbffbb"
| 65 || June 17 || Diamondbacks || 13 – 6 || Lee (8-3) || Halsey (4-5) || || 23,138 || 35-30
|-align="center" bgcolor="#bbffbb"
| 66 || June 18 || Diamondbacks || 3 – 1 || Elarton (4-2) || Webb (7-3) || Wickman (19) || 28,306 || 36-30
|-align="center" bgcolor="#bbffbb"
| 67 || June 19 || Diamondbacks || 3 – 2 || Westbrook (4-9) || Estes (5-5) || Wickman (20) || 27,416 || 37-30
|-align="center" bgcolor="#ffbbbb"
| 68 || June 20 || Red Sox || 10 – 9 || Wells (6-4) || Sabathia (5-4) || Foulke (14) || 30,562 || 37-31
|-align="center" bgcolor="#ffbbbb"
| 69 || June 21 || Red Sox || 9 – 2 || Arroyo (6-3) || Millwood (2-5) || || 28,450 || 37-32
|-align="center" bgcolor="#ffbbbb"
| 70 || June 22 || Red Sox || 5 – 4 || Foulke (5-3) || Wickman (0-2) || || 29,915 || 37-33
|-align="center" bgcolor="#ffbbbb"
| 71 || June 24 || Reds || 5 – 4 || Mercker (2-1) || Howry (4-2) || Weathers (3) || 27,129 || 37-34
|-align="center" bgcolor="#bbffbb"
| 72 || June 25 || Reds || 12 – 7 || Westbrook (5-9) || Hudson (1-2) || || 42,521 || 38-34
|-align="center" bgcolor="#bbffbb"
| 73 || June 26 || Reds || 4 – 3 || Howry (5-2) || Weathers (4-1) || Wickman (21) || 29,355 || 39-34
|-align="center" bgcolor="#bbffbb"
| 74 || June 27 || @ Red Sox || 7 – 0 || Millwood (3-5) || Arroyo (6-4) || || 35,458 || 40-34
|-align="center" bgcolor="#bbffbb"
| 75 || June 28 || @ Red Sox || 12 – 8 || Miller (1-0) || Foulke (5-4) || || 35,445 || 41-34
|-align="center" bgcolor="#ffbbbb"
| 76 || June 29 || @ Red Sox || 5 – 2 || Wakefield (7-6) || Elarton (4-3) || Timlin (1) || 35,069 || 41-35
|-align="center" bgcolor="#bbffbb"
| 77 || June 30 || @ Orioles || 9 – 3 || Westbrook (6-9) || Penn (2-2) || || 27,272 || 42-35 
|-

|-align="center" bgcolor="#bbffbb"
| 78 || July 1 || @ Orioles || 3 – 1 || Sabathia (6-4) || López (7-4) || Wickman (22) || 26,407 || 43-35
|-align="center" bgcolor="#ffbbbb"
| 79 || July 2 || @ Orioles || 4 – 0 || Cabrera (6-7) || Millwood (3-6) || || 38,059 || 43-36
|-align="center" bgcolor="#bbffbb"
| 80 || July 3 || @ Orioles || 9 – 4 || Lee (9-3) || Ponson (7-6) || || 41,655 || 44-36
|-align="center" bgcolor="#bbffbb"
| 81 || July 4 || Tigers || 9 – 3 || Elarton (5-3) || Johnson (5-7) || || 26,869 || 45-36
|-align="center" bgcolor="#bbffbb"
| 82 || July 4 || Tigers || 6 – 0 || Davis (4-2) || Verlander (0-1) || || 33,599 || 46-36
|-align="center" bgcolor="#ffbbbb"
| 83 || July 5 || Tigers || 3 – 2 || Maroth (6-9) || Westbrook (6-10) || Percival (6) || 18,478 || 46-37
|-align="center" bgcolor="#ffbbbb"
| 84 || July 6 || Tigers || 7 – 3 || Bonderman (11-5) || Sabathia (6-5) || Percival (7) || 22,539 || 46-38
|-align="center" bgcolor="#ffbbbb"
| 85 || July 7 || @ Yankees || 7 – 2 || Mussina (9-5) || Millwood (3-7) || || 52,201 || 46-39
|-align="center" bgcolor="#ffbbbb"
| 86 || July 8 || @ Yankees || 5 – 4 || Wang (6-3) || Lee (9-4) || Rivera (19) || 52,938 || 46-40
|-align="center" bgcolor="#bbffbb"
| 87 || July 9 || @ Yankees || 8 – 7 || Elarton (6-3) || May (0-1) || Wickman (23) || 54,366 || 47-40
|-align="center" bgcolor="#ffbbbb"
| 88 || July 10 || @ Yankees || 9 – 4 || Johnson (9-6) || Westbrook (6-11) || Rivera (20) || 54,256 || 47-41
|-
|align="center" colspan="9" style="background:#bbbbff"|All-Star Break
|-align="center" bgcolor="#ffbbbb"
| 89 || July 14 || White Sox || 1 – 0 || Contreras (5-5) || Millwood (3-8) || Hermanson (22) || 21,472 || 47-42
|-align="center" bgcolor="#ffbbbb"
| 90 || July 15 || White Sox || 7 – 1 || García (9-3) || Sabathia (6-6) || || 29,684 || 47-43
|-align="center" bgcolor="#ffbbbb"
| 91 || July 16 || White Sox || 7 – 5 || Buehrle (11-3) || Westbrook (6-12) || Marte (3) || 27,114 || 47-44
|-align="center" bgcolor="#ffbbbb"
| 92 || July 17 || White Sox || 4 – 0 || Garland (14-4) || Elarton (6-4) || || 24,548 || 47-45
|-align="center" bgcolor="#bbffbb"
| 93 || July 18 || Royals  || 6 – 2 || Lee (10-4) || Carrasco (4-4) || || 18,073 || 48-45
|-align="center" bgcolor="#ffbbbb"
| 94 || July 19 || Royals || 4 – 0 || Greinke (3-11) || Millwood (3-9) || || 20,862 || 48-46
|-align="center" bgcolor="#ffbbbb"
| 95 || July 20 || Royals || 5 – 3 || Lima (3-8) || Sabathia (6-7) || MacDougal (13) || 21,860 || 48-47
|-align="center" bgcolor="#bbffbb"
| 96 || July 21 || Royals || 10 – 1 || Westbrook (7-12) || Howell (1-4) || || 24,694 || 49-47
|-align="center" bgcolor="#ffbbbb"
| 97 || July 22 || Mariners || 4 – 3 || Putz (3-3) || Elarton (6-5) || Guardado (22) || 27,208 || 49-48
|-align="center" bgcolor="#bbffbb"
| 98 || July 23 || Mariners || 4 – 3 || Lee (11-4) || Meche (10-7) || Wickman (24) || 28,498 || 50-48
|-align="center" bgcolor="#bbffbb"
| 99 || July 24 || Mariners || 6 – 3 || Millwood (4-9) || Sele (6-11) || || 22,863 || 51-48
|-align="center" bgcolor="#ffbbbb"
| 100 || July 25 || @ Athletics || 13 – 4 || Zito (9-8) || Sabathia (6-8) || || 19,242 || 51-49
|-align="center" bgcolor="#bbffbb"
| 101 || July 26 || @ Athletics || 2 – 0 || Westbrook (8-12) || Blanton (5-9) || Wickman (25) || 18,606 || 52-49
|-align="center" bgcolor="#ffbbbb"
| 102 || July 27 || @ Athletics || 5 – 4 (10) || Street (4-1) || Riske (2-3) || || 40,331 || 52-50
|-align="center" bgcolor="#bbffbb"
| 103 || July 28 || @ Mariners || 6 – 5 || Howry (6-2) || Putz (4-4) || Wickman (26) || 28,500 || 53-50
|-align="center" bgcolor="#bbffbb"
| 104 || July 29 || @ Mariners || 10 – 5 || Millwood (5-9) || Sele (6-12) || || 32,966 || 54-50
|-align="center" bgcolor="#ffbbbb"
| 105 || July 30 || @ Mariners || 3 – 2 || Franklin (6-11) || Sabathia (6-9) || Guardado (24) || 37,719 || 54-51
|-align="center" bgcolor="#bbffbb"
| 106 || July 31 || @ Mariners || 9 – 7 || Westbrook (9-12) || Piñeiro (3-7) || Wickman (27) || 33,652 || 55-51
|-

|-align="center" bgcolor="#bbffbb"
| 107 || August 2 || Yankees || 6 – 5 || Elarton (7-5) || Leiter (1-3) || Wickman (28) || 34,457 || 56-51
|-align="center" bgcolor="#bbffbb"
| 108 || August 3 || Yankees || 7 – 4 || Lee (12-4) || Mussina (10-7) || Wickman (29) || 35,737 || 57-51
|-align="center" bgcolor="#ffbbbb"
| 109 || August 4 || Yankees || 4 – 3 || Gordon (5-4) || Wickman (0-3) || Rivera (27) || 40,048 || 57-52
|-align="center" bgcolor="#bbffbb"
| 110 || August 5 || @ Tigers || 9 – 6 || Sabathia (7-9) || Robertson (5-9) || Howry (3) || 38,928 || 58-52
|-align="center" bgcolor="#bbffbb"
| 111 || August 6 || @ Tigers || 4 – 2 || Westbrook (10-12) || Bonderman (13-8) || Wickman (30) || 39,817 || 59-52
|-align="center" bgcolor="#bbffbb"
| 112 || August 7 || @ Tigers || 6 – 5 || Riske (3-3) || Rodney (1-2) || Wickman (31) || 34,553 || 60-52
|-align="center" bgcolor="#bbffbb"
| 113 || August 9 || @ Royals || 13 – 7 || Sauerbeck (1-0) || MacDougal (2-4) || || 15,182 || 61-52
|-align="center" bgcolor="#bbffbb"
| 114 || August 10 || @ Royals || 6 – 1 || Sabathia (8-9) || Greinke (3-14) || || 16,061 || 62-52
|-align="center" bgcolor="#bbffbb"
| 115 || August 11 || @ Royals || 4 – 2 || Millwood (6-9) || Carrasco (5-6) || Wickman (32) || 14,506 || 63-52
|-align="center" bgcolor="#ffbbbb"
| 116 || August 12 || Devil Rays || 8 – 6 || Hendrickson (7-7) || Westbrook (10-13) || Báez (24) || 22,597 || 63-53
|-align="center" bgcolor="#ffbbbb"
| 117 || August 13 || Devil Rays || 8 – 2 || McClung (3-7) || Elarton (7-6) || || 34,765 || 63-54
|-align="center" bgcolor="#ffbbbb"
| 118 || August 14 || Devil Rays || 1 – 0 || Borowski (1-0) || Wickman (0-4) || Báez (25) || 25,361 || 63-55
|-align="center" bgcolor="#bbffbb"
| 119 || August 16 || Rangers || 8 – 2 || Sabathia (9-9) || Rogers (11-6) || || 27,403 || 64-55
|-align="center" bgcolor="#ffbbbb"
| 120 || August 17 || Rangers || 3 – 0 || Young (10-7) || Millwood (6-10) || Cordero (27) || 20,442 || 64-56
|-align="center" bgcolor="#bbffbb"
| 121 || August 18 || Rangers || 9 – 4 || Westbrook (11-13) || Wilson (0-6) || || 23,214 || 65-56
|-align="center" bgcolor="#bbffbb"
| 122 || August 19 || Orioles || 5 – 4 (10) || Cabrera (1-0) || Kline (2-4) || || 33,160 || 66-56
|-align="center" bgcolor="#bbffbb"
| 123 || August 20 || Orioles || 6 – 1 || Lee (13-4) || López (12-7) || || 41,034 || 67-56
|-align="center" bgcolor="#bbffbb"
| 124 || August 21 || Orioles || 5 – 1 || Sabathia (10-9) || Chen (10-7) || || 28,025 || 68-56
|-align="center" bgcolor="#bbffbb"
| 125 || August 22 || @ Devil Rays || 11 – 4 || Millwood (7-10) || Miller (1-1) || || 8,564 || 69-56
|-align="center" bgcolor="#bbffbb"
| 126 || August 23 || @ Devil Rays || 5 – 4 || Westbrook (12-13) || Miller (1-2) || Wickman (33) || 8,648 || 70-56
|-align="center" bgcolor="#ffbbbb"
| 127 || August 24 || @ Devil Rays || 13 – 3 || McClung (5-7) || Elarton (7-7) || || 11,261 || 70-57
|-align="center" bgcolor="#bbffbb"
| 128 || August 25 || @ Devil Rays || 12 – 4 || Lee (14-4) || Kazmir (7-9) || || 9,172 || 71-57
|-align="center" bgcolor="#bbffbb"
| 129 || August 26 || @ Blue Jays || 9 – 3 || Sabathia (11-9) || McGowan (1-2) || || 24,649 || 72-57
|-align="center" bgcolor="#ffbbbb"
| 130 || August 27 || @ Blue Jays || 2 – 1 || Downs (2-3) || Millwood (7-11) || Batista (24) || 27,630 || 72-58
|-align="center" bgcolor="#bbffbb"
| 131 || August 28 || @ Blue Jays || 4 – 1 || Westbrook (13-13) || Towers (10-10) || Wickman (34) || 31,785 || 73-58
|-align="center" bgcolor="#bbffbb"
| 132 || August 29 || Tigers || 10 – 8 || Cabrera (2-0) || Bonderman (14-11) || Wickman (35) || 22,713 || 74-58
|-align="center" bgcolor="#bbbbbb"
| --- || August 30 || Tigers || colspan=6|Postponed (rain) Rescheduled for September 8
|-align="center" bgcolor="#ffbbbb"
| 133 || August 31 || Tigers || 4 – 3 || Maroth (12-12) || Betancourt (2-3) || Rodney (7) || 22,091 || 74-59
|-

|-align="center" bgcolor="#bbffbb"
| 134 || September 2 || @ Twins || 6 – 1 || Sabathia (12-9) || Radke (9-11) || || 16,119 || 75-59
|-align="center" bgcolor="#ffbbbb"
| 135 || September 3 || @ Twins || 3 – 2 || Nathan (7-3) || Howry (6-3) || || 21,757 || 75-60
|-align="center" bgcolor="#ffbbbb"
| 136 || September 4 || @ Twins || 7 – 5 || Crain (10-4) || Westbrook (13-14) || Nathan (35) || 21,717 || 75-61
|-align="center" bgcolor="#bbffbb"
| 137 || September 5 || @ Tigers || 2 – 0 || Elarton (8-7) || Maroth (12-13) || Wickman (36) || 26,150 || 76-61
|-align="center" bgcolor="#bbffbb"
| 138 || September 6 || @ Tigers || 6 – 1 || Lee (15-4) || Johnson (7-12) || || 15,308 || 77-61
|-align="center" bgcolor="#bbffbb"
| 139 || September 7 || @ Tigers || 4 – 1 || Sabathia (13-9) || Colón (1-1) || || 13,193 || 78-61
|-align="center" bgcolor="#bbffbb"
| 140 || September 8 || Tigers || 4 – 2 || Betancourt (3-3) || Robertson (6-13) || Wickman (37) || 20,363 || 79-61
|-align="center" bgcolor="#bbffbb"
| 141 || September 9 || Twins || 4 – 2 || Westbrook (14-14) || Santana (13-7) || Wickman (38) || 26,078 || 80-61
|-align="center" bgcolor="#bbffbb"
| 142 || September 10 || Twins || 7 – 5 || Elarton (9-7) || Baker (1-2) || Wickman (39) || 32,123 || 81-61
|-align="center" bgcolor="#bbffbb"
| 143 || September 11 || Twins || 12 – 4 || Lee (16-4) || Silva (9-8) || || 38,564 || 82-61
|-align="center" bgcolor="#ffbbbb"
| 144 || September 12 || Athletics || 2 – 0 || Haren (13-10) || Sabathia (13-10) || Street (21) || 20,282 || 82-62
|-align="center" bgcolor="#bbffbb"
| 145 || September 13 || Athletics || 5 – 2 || Millwood (8-11) || Duchscherer (6-4) || Wickman (40) || 21,564 || 83-62
|-align="center" bgcolor="#bbffbb"
| 146 || September 14 || Athletics || 6 – 4 || Westbrook (15-14) || Zito (13-12) || Wickman (41) || 21,920 || 84-62
|-align="center" bgcolor="#bbffbb"
| 147 || September 16 || Royals || 3 – 1 || Elarton (10-7) || Gobble (1-1) || Wickman (42) || 21,975 || 85-62
|-align="center" bgcolor="#bbffbb"
| 148 || September 17 || Royals || 5 – 4 || Lee (17-4) || Hernández (8-12) || Wickman (43) || 32,392 || 86-62
|-align="center" bgcolor="#bbffbb"
| 149 || September 18 || Royals || 11 – 0 || Sabathia (14-10) || Lima (5-16) || || 22,654 || 87-62
|-align="center" bgcolor="#bbffbb"
| 150 || September 19 || @ White Sox || 7 – 5 || Betancourt (4-3) || Marte (3-4) || Wickman (44) || 35,748 || 88-62
|-align="center" bgcolor="#ffbbbb"
| 151 || September 20 || @ White Sox || 7 – 6 (10) || Hermanson (2-4) || Riske (3-4) || || 26,147 || 88-63
|-align="center" bgcolor="#bbffbb"
| 152 || September 21 || @ White Sox || 8 – 0 || Elarton (11-7) || Garland (17-10) || || 36,543 || 89-63
|-align="center" bgcolor="#bbffbb"
| 153 || September 22 || @ Royals || 11 – 6 || Lee (18-4) || Sisco (2-4) || Betancourt (1) || 10,028 || 90-63
|-align="center" bgcolor="#bbffbb"
| 154 || September 23 || @ Royals || 7 – 6 || Howry (7-3) || MacDougal (4-6) || Wickman (45) || 12,519 || 91-63
|-align="center" bgcolor="#bbffbb"
| 155 || September 24 || @ Royals || 11 – 4 || Millwood (9-11) || Wood (5-8) || || 17,358 || 92-63
|-align="center" bgcolor="#ffbbbb"
| 156 || September 25 || @ Royals || 5 – 4 || MacDougal (5-6) || Howry (7-4) || || 11,453 || 92-64
|-align="center" bgcolor="#ffbbbb"
| 157 || September 27 || Devil Rays || 5 – 4 || Kazmir (10-9) || Elarton (11-8) || Báez (40) || 23,795 || 92-65
|-align="center" bgcolor="#ffbbbb"
| 158 || September 28 || Devil Rays || 1 – 0 || McClung (7-11) || Lee (18-5) || Báez (41) || 24,356 || 92-66
|-align="center" bgcolor="#bbffbb"
| 159 || September 29 || Devil Rays || 6 – 0 || Sabathia (15-10) || Fossum (8-12) || || 25,870 || 93-66
|-align="center" bgcolor="#ffbbbb"
| 160 || September 30 || White Sox || 3 – 2 (13) || Politte (7-1) || Cabrera (2-1) || Jenks (5) || 41,072 || 93-67
|-

|-align="center" bgcolor="#ffbbbb"
| 161 || October 1 || White Sox || 4 – 3 || Garland (18-10) || Westbrook (15-15) || Jenks (6) || 41,026 || 93-68
|-align="center" bgcolor="#ffbbbb"
| 162 || October 2 || White Sox || 3 – 1 || McCarthy (3-2) || Elarton (11-9) || Hernández (1) || 41,034 || 93-69
|-

Player stats

Batting
Note: G = Games played; AB = At bats; R = Runs scored; H = Hits; 2B = Doubles; 3B = Triples; HR = Home runs; RBI = Runs batted in; AVG = Batting average; SB = Stolen bases

Pitching
Note: W = Wins; L = Losses; ERA = Earned run average; G = Games pitched; GS = Games started; SV = Saves; IP = Innings pitched; H = Hits allowed; R = Runs allowed; ER = Earned runs allowed; BB = Walks allowed; K = Strikeouts

Awards and honors

All-Star Game

Minor league affiliates

References

2005 Cleveland Indians at Baseball Reference
2005 Cleveland Indians at Baseball Almanac

Cleveland Guardians seasons
Cleveland Indians season
Cleve